Travis Ward (born May 9, 1996) is an American soccer player who currently plays as a defender for Chattanooga FC in the National Independent Soccer Association.

Early life
Raised in the New Egypt section of Plumsted Township, New Jersey, Ward attended New Egypt High School before playing collegiate soccer at Rowan University.

Club career
In November 2018, Ward attended an open tryout for USL League One side Greenville Triumph SC ahead of the team's first season in the new league. It was announced on February 6, 2019 that he, along with fellow standout Dominic Boland, had been signed by the team. Ward made his debut on March 29 in the league's first ever game, coming on as a second half substitution in a 1–0 loss to Tormenta FC. He scored his first professional goal on May 11 against Lansing Ignite and earned Greenville a 1–1 draw. On November 11, Greenville announced it had declined an option on re-signing Ward.

On February 21, 2020, Ward was announced as a new player by Michigan Stars FC ahead of its first season in the National Independent Soccer Association. He scored the first professional goal in the team's history on March 7 in a 2–1 loss to Oakland Roots SC.

In April 2021, Ward joined Stumptown AC ahead of the spring 2021 season.

References

External links
 
 
 Profile at Rowan Athletics

1996 births
Living people
American soccer players
Association football forwards
Greenville Triumph SC players
Michigan Stars FC players
People from Plumsted Township, New Jersey
Rowan University alumni
Soccer players from New Jersey
Sportspeople from Ocean County, New Jersey
USL League One players
National Independent Soccer Association players